G. Taru Sharma (born 4 August 1965) is an Indian biologist and the head of the physiology and climatology division at the Indian Veterinary Research Institute of the Indian Council of Agricultural Research. Known for her studies on germ cell marker genes, Sharma is an elected fellow of the National Academy of Agricultural Sciences and National Academy of Sciences (NASI). The Department of Biotechnology of the Government of India awarded her the National Bioscience Award for Career Development, one of the highest Indian science awards, for her contributions to biosciences in 2006.

Biography 
G. Taru Sharma, born on 4 August 1965 at the heritage city of Mathura in the Indian state of Uttar Pradesh, did her early schooling at the St. Mary's Convent School, Mhow and her college studies at the Kishori Raman Girls College in Mathura and Agra College in Agra. Her doctoral research was at the Indian Veterinary Research Institute (IVRI) and after securing a PhD in 1990, she did her post-doctoral work as a research scientist at the Centre for Biotechnology of the National Dairy Development Board. In 1991, she joined the Central Institute for Research on Goats of the Indian Council of Agricultural Research (ICAR) but moved to the Indian Veterinary Research Institute, another ICAR institution in 2000. She has been with the institute since then, serving as a senior scientist or a principal scientist and holds the position of the director and head of CAFT in Veterinary Physiology since 2009. She also heads the physiology and climatology division of the institute. In between, she had a short stint in the US at the Reproductive Biotechnology Laboratory of the University of Louisiana as a fellow of the Food and Agriculture Organization and a visiting scientist in 1999.

Legacy 

Sharma's core areas of research have been in the fields of molecular reproductive physiology, oocyte and embryo genomics as well as stem cell biology. She has undertaken and led several projects including the project on Stem cells: its biology and therapeutic application in livestock and pets, a flagship program of IVRI. She is known to have done extended studies on early pregnancy detection in water buffaloes, and has developed various techniques for oocyte recovery, somatic cell development and immuno-histochemical localization of the proteins. Some of the research findings were later brought out as a book, Nitric oxide and ovarian folliculogenesis: A study of follicular development in water buffalo (Bubalis bubalus). Her studies have been documented by way of a number of articles and ResearchGate, an online repository of scientific articles has listed 130 of them. Besides, she is the author of twenty manuals as well as three books and has contributed chapters to books published by others. She also holds two patents for processes developed by her and has guided several post-graduate and doctoral scholars in their studies.

Sharma has been a member of the editorial board of the Reproductive Health and Medicine of the ISSRF and presides the Animal Physiologists Association (APA). She is a life member of organizations such as the Society of Animal Physiologists of India, the Physiological Society of India, the Society of Veterinary Physiologists, and Biochemists of India and the Indian Science Congress Association. Life member of ISSRF, Indian Society of Veterinary Immunologists and Biotechnologists.

Awards and honors 
Taru Sharma received two young scientist honors early in her career; the Young Scientist Gold Medal of the Society of Animal Physiologists of India in 1993 and the Young Scientists Merit Certificate of the Indian Science Congress Association in 1994. The Indian Society for the Study of Animal Reproduction chose her for the Prof. Nils Lagerlof Memorial Award in 2001 and she received the Award of Honor of the IVRI in 2002. The Indian Society for Integrated Women and Child Development (ISIWCD) selected her for the Livelihood Award (WEAL) at the World Women Summit of 2003 and the Indian Council of Agricultural Research honored her with the Panjab Rao Deshmukh Women Agricultural Scientist Award in 2004.The Department of Biotechnology of the Government of India awarded her the National Bioscience Award for Career Development, one of the highest Indian science awards in 2006 and the Government of Uttar Pradesh honored her services in the therapeutics of canine clinical cases with an Award of Honor in 2011; the same year as she received the Best Teacher Award of the IVRI. The Society of Animal Physiologists of India honored her again in 2012 with the Dr. A. Roy Memorial Award and she was selected for the Research Excellence Award of the Indus Global Organization the next year. In 2016, she received two awards, the Labhsetwar Award of the Indian Society for the study of Reproduction and Fertility and the Bharat Ratna Dr. C. Subramaniam Award for Outstanding Teachers of the ICAR. Became NAAS fellow from 1.1.2017. Became SAPI fellow during the year 2018. G.P.Talwar gold medal award for 2019. Rafi Ahmed Kidwai award for outstanding research by Indian Council of Agriculture Research in 2019.Elected as Fellow NASI in 2019. Executive member of NAAS from 2021.

Selected bibliography

Books

Articles

See also 

 Folliculogenesis
 Mesenchymal stem cell
 Animal physiology

Notes

References

External links 
 
 

N-BIOS Prize recipients
Indian scientific authors
Living people
1965 births
20th-century Indian zoologists
Indian veterinarians
People from Mathura district
Scientists from Uttar Pradesh
Fellows of the National Academy of Agricultural Sciences
Indian physiologists
Animal physiology
Indian patent holders
21st-century Indian inventors